William Percy Kitchen (October 2, 1960 – July 30, 2012) was a Canadian professional ice hockey player. He played 41 games in the National Hockey League with the Montreal Canadiens and Toronto Maple Leafs between 1982 and 1985. He was born in Schomberg, Ontario and was the younger brother of Mike Kitchen.

Playing career
Kitchen played four seasons in the Ontario Hockey League from 1976 to 1980 with the Windsor Spitfires and the Ottawa 67's. He also played for the Canadian national junior team at the 1980 World Junior Championships, where he registered 1 assist in five games.

After being undrafted, Kitchen signed with the Montreal Canadiens. He spent most of his time with the Nova Scotia Voyageurs of the AHL, playing only 12 NHL games from 1981 to 1984. In August 1984, Kitchen signed with the Toronto Maple Leafs as a free agent, unhappy with his minor league status with Montreal.  He enjoyed his most successful season in 1984–85, playing 29 games and recording his only NHL goal. The next season, he was back in the minors with the St. Catharines Saints of the AHL.  He retired from professional hockey following the 1985–86 season.

Personal life and death
Kitchen was a successful Tim Horton's franchisee in Ottawa, Ontario.  He was active in many local charities and a member of the NHL alumni. Kitchen had one son and three daughters.

Kitchen died in Ottawa, Ontario. He suffered a heart attack on July 30, 2012.

Career statistics

Regular season and playoffs

International

References

External links
 

1960 births
2012 deaths
Canadian ice hockey defencemen
Ice hockey people from Ontario
Montreal Canadiens players
Nova Scotia Voyageurs players
Ottawa 67's players
St. Catharines Saints players
Sportspeople from King, Ontario
Toronto Maple Leafs players
Undrafted National Hockey League players
Windsor Spitfires players